Caryocolum moehringiae is a moth of the family Gelechiidae. It is found from Germany to the Pyrenees, Italy and Greece.

The length of the forewings is 5.5–6 mm. The forewings are whitish mottled with grey-brown and with scattered orange-brown scales. Adults have been recorded on wing from early June to late August.

The larvae feed on Moehringia muscosa and Moehringia bavarica. Young larvae mine the leaves of their host plant. The mine has the form of a broad gallery with much frass. Older larvae live free among spun shoot tips or in a leaf that is rolled and fastened with silk. Larvae can be found from April to May. Young larvae have a yellowish body and a black head, while older larvae have a grass green body.

References

Moths described in 1954
moehringiae
Moths of Europe